Ričardas Berankis was the defending champion but chose not to defend his title.

Stefano Napolitano won the title after defeating Alessandro Giannessi 6–4, 6–1 in the final.

Seeds

Draw

Finals

Top half

Bottom half

References
 Main Draw
 Qualifying Draw

Sparkassen ATP Challenger - Singles
2016 Singles